O27 may refer to:
 Fokker O-27, an observation aircraft of the United States Army Air Corps
 , a submarine of the Royal Netherlands Navy
 O27 gauge, a model railway scale
 Oakdale Airport, in Stanislaus County, California, United States
 Oxygen-27, an isotope of oxygen